Rick Jaffa (born May 8, 1956) and Amanda Silver (born May 24, 1963) are an American married screenwriting and film production duo.

They are best known for having written and co-produced the 2011 science-fiction film Rise of the Planet of the Apes, a commercially and critically successful reboot of the Planet of the Apes franchise for which they were nominated for the Saturn Award for Best Writing. They were also co-writers/producers of its 2014 sequel Dawn of the Planet of the Apes, and they produced the third installment, War for the Planet of the Apes, in 2017.

They co-wrote Jurassic World and the screen story of In the Heart of the Sea, both 2015 films. In 2013, they were announced to be the co-writers of all 4 sequels to James Cameron's Avatar, starting with Avatar: The Way of Water, which was theatrically released in 2022.

Personal lives 
Jaffa and Silver have been married since 1989 and have two children. Silver is the sister of actor Michael B. Silver and the granddaughter of screenwriter and producer Sidney Buchman. In 2015, she was named one of the "Most Influential Women In Hollywood" by Elle Magazine.

Filmography

References

External links
 
 

Place of birth missing (living people)
Year of birth missing (living people)
American screenwriters
American film producers
Married couples
Screenwriting duos
Living people
Jewish American screenwriters
21st-century American Jews